The 2004 CECAFA Cup, officially called Amoudi Senior Challenge Cup due to sponsorship reasons, was the 28th edition of the tournament. It was held in Ethiopia, and was won by Ethiopia. The matches were played between December 11–25. All matches were played in the National Stadium in Addis Ababa.

Eritrea and Djibouti withdrew before the draw.

Group stage

Group A

Group B

Knockout stage

Semi-finals

Third place match

Final

References

External links
 RSSSF archives

CECAFA Cup
International association football competitions hosted by Ethiopia
2004 in Ethiopian sport